Marek Sebastian Leśniak (born 29 February 1964) is a Polish former professional footballer who played as a striker. A prolific goalscorer, he was successful in his country in the 1980s, and then had a career in Germany which spanned nearly 20 years, broken by a half-year stint in Switzerland.

Career
Leśniak was born in Goleniów. He started his professional career with Pogoń Szczecin, topping the Ekstraklasa goal charts in 1986–87, for a final runner-up position. In 1988, he moved abroad, with Germany's Bayer Leverkusen, starting well (three Bundesliga goals in his first six games).

After a couple of solid seasons, Leśniak lost his importance in the side after the arrival of Ulf Kirsten, eventually leaving in 1992 to SG Wattenscheid 09, totalling 25 goals in three seasons. He continued to play in the country until 2006 (aged 42), in various levels (from 2002–05, he also acted as player-coach for SSVg Velbert).

Career statistics

International goals
Scores and results list Poland's goal tally first, score column indicates score after each Leśniak goal.

References

External links
 
 
 

1964 births
Living people
People from Goleniów
Sportspeople from West Pomeranian Voivodeship
Polish footballers
Association football forwards
Ekstraklasa players
Pogoń Szczecin players
Bundesliga players
2. Bundesliga players
Bayer 04 Leverkusen players
SG Wattenscheid 09 players
TSV 1860 Munich players
KFC Uerdingen 05 players
Fortuna Düsseldorf players
SC Preußen Münster players
SSVg Velbert players
Swiss Super League players
Neuchâtel Xamax FCS players
Poland international footballers
Poland youth international footballers
Polish expatriate footballers
Polish expatriate sportspeople in Germany
Expatriate footballers in Germany
Polish expatriate sportspeople in Switzerland
Expatriate footballers in Switzerland
Polish football managers
SSVg Velbert managers